SS Yongala was a passenger and cargo ship that sank off Cape Bowling Green, Queensland, Australia on 23 March 1911. En route from Melbourne to Cairns she steamed into a cyclone and sank south of Townsville. 

All 122 aboard died, and traces of the ship were not found until days later, when cargo and wreckage began to wash ashore at Cape Bowling Green and at Cleveland Bay. It was believed that the hull of the ship had been ripped open by a submerged rock. The wreck, which has become a tourist attraction and dive site, was not found until 1958.

Design and construction
SS Yongala was a steel passenger and freight steamer built by Armstrong Whitworth & Co Ltd in Newcastle upon Tyne, England to special survey for the Adelaide Steamship Company, at a cost of £102,000. She was launched on 29 April 1903, and was registered in Adelaide. The vessel was named after the small town of Yongala in South Australia, a word from the Ngadjuri language which meant "good water".

The vessel was propelled by a large triple expansion steam engine built by Wallsend Shipway and Engineering Co., which drove a single propeller. Five single ended steel boilers working under natural draught supplied steam of  pressure. At 15 knots, Yongalas engines burned approximately 67 tonnes of coal per day. A direct acting steam windlass and capstan was fitted on the forecastle head. 

Cargo handling was done with two steam cranes, along with seven winches with derricks and derrick-posts. Electric lighting was fitted throughout the ship with a duplicate generating plant. She was also provided with refrigeration facilities for the carriage of frozen cargo. A specially arranged steam and hand steering gear was fitted in a house at the after end of the fantail and controlled from the bridge.

Operational history
On entry into service, Yongala operated on the passenger route linking the gold fields of Western Australia with the eastern ports of Adelaide, Melbourne and Sydney.

In 1906, Yongala was transferred to the Brisbane–Fremantle route. The ship was the first to sail the  direct route between Fremantle and Brisbane; the longest interstate trip at that time. During the winter months from 1907 to early 1911, a lack of demand on the Brisbane-Fremantle run meant the ship was reassigned to the Adelaide Steamship Company's Melbourne-Cairns route.

Final voyage

On 14 March 1911, under the command of Captain William Knight, Yongala embarked on her 99th voyage in Australian waters. She left Melbourne with 72 passengers, heading for Brisbane, where she arrived on 20 March. In Brisbane, most of the passengers from Melbourne disembarked, and new passengers and cargo headed up the Queensland coast (including the racehorse Moonshine and a Lincoln Red bull) were loaded. A harbour inspection found Yongala to be "in excellent trim", and she sailed for Mackay, where she was due on 23 March.

Despite delays in Brisbane, Yongala arrived in Mackay on the morning of 23 March. After the transfer of passengers and cargo, the ship sailed north for Townsville at 1:40 pm, carrying 49 passengers, 73 crew, and 617 tons of cargo in the lower hold. Five hours later, the lighthouse keeper of the Dent Island Light saw Yongala sail into the Whitsunday Passage; the last known sighting of the ship. Shortly before the vessel left sight of land at Mackay, a telegram was received by the Flat Top signal station warning of a tropical cyclone between Townsville and Mackay. Flag and wireless signals from the station prompted several ships to take refuge at Mackay, but Yongala did not see the flags, and was yet to be fitted with wireless equipment.

Yongala sank during the cyclone on 24 March 1911. All of her 122 passengers and crew died in the tragedy.

Aftermath
The lack of Yongalas arrival in Townsville did not immediately cause concern, with the assumption that the ship had taken shelter from the cyclone. After three other ships arrived in Townsville, Yongala was listed as missing on 26 March, with the note that she may have been lost as early as 23 March. Queensland Premier Digby Denham turned all of the state's resources over to search efforts, including seven vessels operated by the public service, police and shipping. Wreckage was found washed up on beaches from Hinchinbrook Island to Bowen, but there was no sign of the ship or those aboard. The only body found was of the racehorse Moonshine, which washed up at the mouth of Gordon Creek. A£1,000 reward for information leading to the discovery of the ship was offered by the Queensland government, but this was withdrawn after no useful information came forward.

Several theories were offered for the ship's disappearance. Some speculated that Yongala had fallen victim to the cyclone; the high winds would have come from perpendicular to the ship's course and overpowered the vessel. Others thought she had grounded on a submerged reef between Flinders Passage and Keeper Reef, run into Nares Rock, or struck Cape Upstart.

The Marine Board of Queensland investigated the loss of Yongala from 8 to 20 June 1911. With no witnesses to the ship's fate, the inquiry considered the ship's stability, equipment and seaworthiness, together Captain William Knight's capabilities as a ship's master. After finding no fault with the condition of the ship (based on design specifications supplied by the Adelaide Steamship Company, along with data from sea trials and seven years of uneventful operation) or with Knight's abilities (his reputation as one of Adelaide Steamship Company's most capable men, and 14 years' service without incident) the Board concluded that "the fate of the Yongala passes beyond human ken into the realms of conjecture, to add one more to the mysteries of the sea". The Board did note the increased risk of navigating the Great Barrier Reef during tropical cyclone season was risky, and that the safest option was to secure the best anchorage available and ride the storm out.

A "Yongala distress fund" was set up in March 1911, with money raised used for the relief of families of those aboard. The fund was closed on 30 September 1914, with the £900 remaining credited to the Queensland Shipwreck Society.

Discovery
In 1943, a minesweeper fouled on what was then thought to be a shoal, eleven miles east of Cape Bowling Green. The captain marked on his chart an obstruction in about thirteen fathoms (24 m), dead on the track of vessels bound for Townsville.

After the end of the war, the obstruction was investigated by the survey ship HMAS Lachlan. She arrived over the area in June 1947, and after several runs in the locality using anti-submarine instruments and echo sounder, found what appeared to be a patch of shoal water at six fathoms (11 m) surrounded by soundings from twelve to fourteen fathoms (22 to 26 m). The only ship that had been reported missing in those waters was Yongala. The Navy did nothing to follow up the find.

In 1958, Bill Kirkpatrick located the wreck and brought to the surface a barnacle-encrusted steel safe which they found in a cabin. When broken open with a pinch bar, hammer and chisel, the safe was found to contain nothing but black sludge. The only thing that offered a clue to identification of the ship was part of the safe's serial number—9825W. It was subsequently established that it was a Chubb strongbox and the number was sent to the manufacturers in London for tracing. In 1961, the reply came back that the safe was one supplied to the purser's cabin of the SS Yongala during her construction in 1903.

Position
The bow points in a northerly direction (347°), and although she lies listing to starboard at an angle of between 60° and 70°, the vessel's structural integrity has been retained.

The sea floor surrounding the wreck is open and sandy, so the wreck has become an established artificial reef, providing a structurally complex habitat for a diverse range of marine life. In 1981 the wreck was sketched by marine biologist Leon Zann. Although the superstructure of the wreck remains intact and very much like this sketch, the significant buildup of sand around the starboard side of the vessel has been scoured away, and the ventilators and railings have collapsed.

The wreck of Yongala lies within the central section of the Great Barrier Reef Marine Park. The wreck is protected under the Commonwealth Historic Shipwrecks Act 1976 and is managed through the Museum of Tropical Queensland, Townsville. Penetration diving and interference with artefacts is prohibited under the terms of the Act. 

Access to the site is via permit only, obtainable from the Maritime Archaeology Section of the Museum of Tropical Queensland In late 2002, the site had several moorings installed to ensure that no more impact damage occurs by careless anchoring practices. A policy of 'No Anchoring' was also introduced within the protected zone following the installation of the moorings. In addition to statutory protection, the site was also listed on the now-defunct Register of the National Estate.

Present day

SS Yongala is today a major tourist attraction for the recreational diving industry in Townsville and North Queensland. It is a popular dive spot with an extensive array of marine life. A citizen science database using iNaturalist has recorded over 213 observations of 79 species with the most observed species the Humphead Maori Wrasse  More than 10,000 divers visit the wreck every year.

The Maritime Museum of Townsville has an extensive display of Yongala memorabilia.

The death of Tina Watson occurred near the dive site on 22 October 2003. Watson's husband of eleven days was subsequently imprisoned for manslaughter.

The heritage-listed Yongala Lodge in North Ward, Townsville, is named after the SS Yongala. The house was originally built for Matthew Rooney who died on the Yongala in 1911 along with his wife and youngest daughter.

In media
The wreck appeared in an episode of the Great Barrier Reef documentary, where it was seen as a home for many sea creatures.

See also

References

Further reading

External links 

 
 
 
 
 

Shipwrecks in the Coral Sea
Shipwrecks of Queensland
Maritime incidents in 1911
Merchant ships of Australia
Iron and steel steamships of Australia
Ships built on the River Tyne
1903 ships
Underwater diving sites in Australia
Ships lost with all hands
Queensland places listed on the defunct Register of the National Estate
North Queensland
Australian Shipwrecks with protected zone
Ships built by Armstrong Whitworth
March 1911 events